Buckner is a city in Jackson County, Missouri, United States. The population was 3,076 at the 2010 census. For decades it was best known for TV and radio commercials promoting local automobile dealership Lasater Ford, run by the Lasater brothers, Wilson and Milton and later Halverson Ford. It is part of the Kansas City metropolitan area.

Geography
Buckner is located at  (39.134806, -94.198223).

Demographics

2010 census
As of the census of 2010, there were 3,076 people, 1,141 households, and 808 families residing in the city. The racial makeup of the city was 95.6% White, 0.4% African American, 0.4% Native American, 0.1% Asian, 0.2% Pacific Islander, 1.2% from other races, and 2.2% from two or more races. Hispanic or Latino of any race were 3.4% of the population.

There were 1,141 households, of which 41.0% had children under the age of 18 living with them, 50.7% were married couples living together, 13.1% had a female householder with no husband present, 6.9% had a male householder with no wife present, and 29.2% were non-families. 24.2% of all households were made up of individuals, and 10.2% had someone living alone who was 65 years of age or older. The average household size was 2.70 and the average family size was 3.19.

The median age in the city was 33.6 years. 29.5% of residents were under the age of 18; 8% were between the ages of 18 and 24; 28.1% were from 25 to 44; 24.1% were from 45 to 64; and 10.4% were 65 years of age or older. The gender makeup of the city was 50.3% male and 49.7% female.

2000 census
As of the census of 2000, there were 2,725 people, 1,019 households, and 747 families residing in the city. The population density was 1,595.3 people per square mile (615.3/km2). There were 1,065 housing units at an average density of 623.5 per square mile (240.5/km2). The racial makeup of the city was 95.93% White, 0.11% African American, 0.44% Native American, 0.26% Pacific Islander, 0.84% from other races, and 2.42% from two or more races. Hispanic or Latino of any race were 1.98% of the population.

There were 1,019 households, out of which 39.1% had children under the age of 18 living with them, 54.0% were married couples living together, 13.7% had a female householder with no husband present, and 26.6% were non-families. 22.2% of all households were made up of individuals, and 10.4% had someone living alone who was 65 years of age or older. The average household size was 2.67 and the average family size was 3.14.

In the city the population was spread out, with 30.3% under the age of 18, 9.1% from 18 to 24, 29.6% from 25 to 44, 21.0% from 45 to 64, and 10.1% who were 65 years of age or older. The median age was 33 years. For every 100 females, there were 96.9 males. For every 100 females age 18 and over, there were 91.5 males.

The median income for a household in the city was $40,577, and the median income for a family was $45,313. Males had a median income of $36,010 versus $22,372 for females. The per capita income for the city was $16,748. About 7.3% of families and 8.4% of the population were below the poverty line, including 10.4% of those under age 18 and 10.4% of those age 65 or over.

History
Buckner was established in 1875.  In its inception Buckner was a railroad depot town for the Missouri Pacific Railroad.  Where Buckner derives its name from is a point of contention; the town is either named from former US Senator Alexander Buckner (1830-1833) who served on the States Constitutional Convention in 1820, or named after Real Estate operator Simon Buckner. Yet another claim as namesake is Thomas W. Buckner, an original owner of the site.

The WGN America series Outlaw Country was set in Buckner.

Education
Buckner is part of the Fort Osage School District.  The only school within the city limits is Buckner Elementary, for middle school children attend Fire Prairie Middle School, and move onto Fort Osage High School to complete their secondary education.

Buckner has a public library, a branch of the Mid-Continent Public Library.

Media

Newspapers
The Gazette Weekly serves Buckner, Levasy, Sibley, and Eastern Independence on a weekly basis.

References

External links
 City of Buckner (official site)
 Historic maps of Buckner in the Sanborn Maps of Missouri Collection at the University of Missouri
 Article in The History of Jackson county, Missouri (1881)

Cities in Missouri
Cities in Jackson County, Missouri
Populated places established in 1875
1875 establishments in Missouri